The Salle omnisports d'Arzew, sometimes called Salle du 24 février 1971, is an indoor sports arena located in Arzew, Algeria. The official seating capacity of the arena is 3,000.

History
The Omnisport hall (OMS) in Arzew has been reopened after three years of closure during which it underwent major restoration work in anticipation of the 19th edition of the Mediterranean Games scheduled for next summer in Oran.

Sports hosted

Team sports
Futsal, Team Handball, Basket-ball, Volley-ball.

Individual sports
Martial arts (Karate, Judo, Kickboxing ...etc.).

Competitions hosted
Some of major senior competitions are below
Mediterranean Games
1 time (2022)

References

External links
africabizinfo.com

Indoor arenas in Algeria
Volleyball venues in Algeria
Basketball venues in Algeria
Handball venues in Algeria
2007 establishments in Algeria